Olivia De Berardinis, known professionally as Olivia, is an American artist who is famous for her paintings of women, often referred to as pinup or cheesecake art. She has been working in this genre since the mid-1970s, becoming a contributor to Playboy in 1985. By June 2004, she was given her own monthly pinup page for the magazine that continued for many years, often appearing with captions written by Hugh Hefner.

Biography
Schooled in Elizabeth, NJ, De Berardinis arrived in Manhattan in 1967 where she enrolled in the School of Visual Arts.  She resided in New York City's Soho neighborhood from 1970 to 1974, creating Minimalist paintings. De Berardinis was one of the new artists introduced in the Second Annual Contemporary Reflections 1972–73, of the Aldrich Museum of Contemporary Art in Ridgefield, Connecticut. She was also presented as one of 18 new artists in the "Tenth Anniversary, the Larry Aldrich Museum of Contemporary Art 1964-74" with established artists including Eva Hesse, Agnes Martin, and Frank Stella.

By 1975, financial pressures forced De Berardinis to seek out commercial art work. She returned to the skills she had gained as a child, painting women. She did work for periodicals and paperback publishers, advertisements, and movie posters. De Berardinis quickly secured regular work, starting in 1974, painting erotic fantasies for men's magazines.

In 1977, she and partner Joel Beren started the O Card Company to publish De Berardinis' work as greeting cards. They married in 1979 and created another company, Ozone Productions, Ltd., to sell and license Olivia's artwork. In 1987, they moved from Manhattan, New York to Malibu, California, where they reside as of 2011.

De Berardinis' artwork has been shown in art galleries throughout the United States and Japan.

References

Further reading
 Beauties Beasts, by Olivia De Berardinis and Jordu Schell, (Street Date: Feb 1, 2017),  
 Malibu Cheesecake: The Pinup Art of Oliva, 2011,   
 Bettie Page by Olivia, 2006, 
 American Geisha: The Art Of Olivia III, 2003, 
 Cheesecake Chronicles Volume 1: Art of Olivia, 2000, 
 Second Slice: Art of Olivia II, 1997, 
 Let Them Eat Cheesecake: The Art Of Olivia, 1993, 
 The Great American Pin-Up, by Charles G. Martignette and Louis K. Meisel,

External links
 
 "Olivia" in The Encyclopedia of Fantasy
 

1948 births
Living people
Pin-up artists
American erotic artists
American women painters
Playboy illustrators
Painters from California
American women illustrators
American illustrators
21st-century American women artists
People from SoHo, Manhattan